Gabriella Eichinger Ferro-Luzzi is an Italian anthropologist and dravidologist who has done field studies in India, mainly in the Tamil Nadu state.

Born in 1931 in Germany, she studied modern languages at the University of Mainz and did a Ph.D. at the University of Rome in 1968. Between 1985 to 1991, she worked briefly at the University of Venice, University of Bologna, and University of Rome. She taught Tamil language and literature at the University of Naples "L'Orientale" and also worked as a professor of Asian Studies at the university.

Education
Ferro-Luzzi did a Diploma in Modern Languages at the University of Mainz in Germany in 1954. In 1968, she completed her Ph.D. in geography at the University of Rome in Italy with a doctoral thesis in anthropology.

Academic career and research
Ferro-Luzzi is a dravidologist. Since 1971, she has traveled several times to India, mostly to Tamil Nadu, to execute field studies.

Her research studies have been focused on the study of the culture of Hindus as viewed through the lens of Tamil literature; the mythologies and rituals of Hindus; and the "culture-specific and culture-free attitudes towards food, purity and pollution". According to Heinz Scheifinger, she is of the view that Hinduism shows "unity within diversity".

She worked as a teacher in Italy at the University of Venice, University of Bologna, and University of Rome between 1985 and 1991. She had taught the Tamil language at the Institute of Linguistics of University of Rome. She worked at the University of Naples "L'Orientale" in Italy as an associate professor of Tamil language and literature from 1992–93 to 2000–01. She also served as a professor at the department of Asian Studies of the university. She is retired.

Naivedyam
According to Peter Berger, in Ferro-Luzzi's view, the Naivedyam to gods should be "understood as acts of communication and function like linguistic elements, that is, through opposition, combination, and redundancy".

Written work
Ferro-Luzzi's The Maze of Fantasy in Tamil Folktales (2002) was reviewed by Ülo Valk, Sascha Ebeling, and Herman Tieken. Her work was a monographic research on the "Tamil folklore in the Pan-Indian context" and was built on around 50 published collections of Tamil folktales. Valk stated that she provided "several valuable observations" on "dyadic patterns in Tamil folktales, their didactic function and inter-generic connections with songs and proverbs, and conceptualization of the corpus of tales as a polythetic network". Valk suggested that though she was "careful about providing the exact references to the original publications", she did not focus much on "source criticism". She examined a few theories of folktale research and Valk was of the view that her criticism of the contemporary theories was "relatively thin" in comparison to the analytical studies by scholars like Bengt Holbek and Max Lüthi. According to Valk, in future, her research would "probably" be used as a tool for classifying the tales from India which was initiated by Heda Jason, Jonas Balys, Stith Thompson, and Warren E. Roberts.

Ebeling stated that Ferro-Luzzi's research provided a description of "whether and how a particular theme is treated in a Tamil folktale" and also investigated "the interplay of Indian and Western motifs within folktales or motifs which recur in otherwise unconnected tales". According to Ebeling, she criticized the common "tale type approach" and laid stress on the "need to focus on motifs rather than tale types" in an analytical study of folktales. According to Ebeling, her suggested approach for the folktales studies is of assistance in "comparative and cross-cultural studies" of the folktales. Tieken of Leiden's Kern Institute stated that she drew the book's whole material "from existing collections of folktales mainly in Tamil" and she did not "deal with these collections as a phenomenon in itself". He saw her work as translation of excerpts from Hitopadesha in Tamil language, and according to Tieken, the efficacy of her work "for folktale studies is limited".

Ferro-Luzzi's coauthored The Taste of Laughter: Aspects of Tamil Humour (1992) was reviewed by Jawaharlal Nehru University's Sadhana Naithani and Tamil University's Aru Ramanathan and N. Palani. Ramanathan and Palani stated that she explored "multifarious facets" of a village in Tamil Nadu from the aspects of anthropology and literature. She threw light on the village's "cross-cultural and culturally specific" aspects in relation to Ki. Rajanarayanan's works. According to Ramanathan and Palani, she provided insights on "the attitudes of the people toward land, tradition, animals and fellow beings, as well as the ignorance, skepticism, and pragmatism among the people" and was of the view that the people of India "seem to compartmentalize contradictory ideas". Naithani stated that her work was "largely descriptive, with few insights into the aspects of Tamil humor".

According to Laura E. Little, Ferro-Luzzi stressed that though incongruity appears very often in humor, it's not a requisite for humor. Little stated that her work presented the "most prominent challenge to incongruity's essential role in the humor process" and "humor scholars" take it "very seriously", however, they note that her research was "insufficiently theorized and insufficiently supported by examples". For example, Elliott Oring stated that her anatomization of jokes was "incomplete" and the examples provided by her were "questionable".

Works

Books
Some of the books authored by Ferro-Luzzi are as follows:

Selected papers

References

1931 births
Johannes Gutenberg University Mainz alumni
University of Rome Tor Vergata alumni
Academic staff of the Ca' Foscari University of Venice
Academic staff of the University of Bologna
Academic staff of the University of Rome Tor Vergata
Academic staff of the Università degli Studi di Napoli "L'Orientale"
Italian women anthropologists
21st-century anthropologists
Italian women academics
Anthropology writers
Humor researchers
Tamil scholars of non-Tamil background
21st-century Italian educators
Asian studies
21st-century Italian women
Living people